The 2017 Atlantic 10 Conference men's soccer season was the 31st season of varsity soccer in the conference. The regular season began on August 25 and concluded on November 1. The season culminated with the 2017 Atlantic 10 Men's Soccer Tournament which began on November 4 and concluded on November 12.

UMass went on to win both the regular season at tournament championships. Saint Louis entered the season as the defending regular season champions, but a dip in form, prevented them from retaining the title. Fordham were the defending tournament champions, and have qualified for the A-10 Tournament, offering them an opportunity to defend their title. The Fordham Rams were eliminated by UMass in the semifinals.

In addition to UMass; regular season and tournament runners-up, VCU, as well as Fordham qualified for the NCAA Tournament. This was the first time since 2014 that an A-10 team earned an at-large berth in the tournament. Further, this was the most teams the A-10 fielded in the NCAA Tournament since 2012, when there were four berths from the conference. In the tournament, VCU was given a second-round bye and 16 seed where they were eliminated by Butler. Massachusetts and Fordham contested in the first round. Massachusetts fell to Colgate, while Fordham ended up going on a quarterfinal run, knocking off two ACC teams. It was the furthest run by an A-10 team in the tournament since 2011, when Charlotte reached the 2011 College Cup Final.

Preseason

Recruiting

Preseason poll 

The preseason poll was released on August 24, 2017. Fordham was voted to repeat as A-10 champions, with Saint Louis and VCU being close second and thirds.

Regular season 

All times Eastern time.† denotes Homecoming game

Week 1 (Aug 21-27) 

Schedule and results:

Players of the week:

Week 2 (Aug 28-Sep 3) 

Schedule and results:

Players of the week:

Week 3 (Sep 4-10) 

Schedule and results:

Players of the week:

Week 4 (Sep 11-17) 
Schedule and results:

Players of the week:

Week 5 (Sep 18-24) 
Schedule and results:

Players of the week:

Week 6 (Sep 25-Oct 1) 
Schedule and results:

Players of the week:

Week 7 (Oct 2-8) 
Schedule and results:

Players of the week:

Week 8 (Oct 9-15) 
Schedule and results:

Players of the week:

Week 9 (Oct 16-22) 
Schedule and results:

Players of the week:

Week 10 (Oct 23-29) 
Schedule and results:

Players of the week:

Week 11 (Oct 30-Nov 5) 
Schedule and results:

Players of the week:

Rankings

United Soccer Coaches National

United Soccer Coaches Midwest Regional

Postseason

Atlantic 10 Tournament

NCAA Tournament

Awards

Postseason awards

All A-10 awards and teams

All Americans 
Three Atlantic 10 players were named All-Americans by the media.

MLS SuperDraft

Total picks by school

List of selections

Notable non-draft signees 
The following are notable players who went pro following the end of the season that were not selected in the 2018 MLS SuperDraft.

See also 
 2017 NCAA Division I men's soccer season
 2017 Atlantic 10 Men's Soccer Tournament

Notes 
The game between Iona and VCU was cancelled due to inclement weather.The game between Florida Gulf Coast and VCU was cancelled due to inclement weather from Hurricane Irma.

References 

 
2017 NCAA Division I men's soccer season